Sir Reginald Maitland Maxwell,  (1882 – 29 July 1967) was a British administrator in India. He was Home Member of the Governor-General’s Executive Council from 1938 to 1944.

References 

1882 births
1967 deaths
Knights Commander of the Order of the Indian Empire
Knights Grand Commander of the Order of the Star of India
Indian Civil Service (British India) officers
Members of the Council of the Governor General of India